The Central District of Darab County is a district (bakhsh) in Darab County, Fars Province, Iran. At the 2006 census, its population was 137,677, in 32,165 families.  The District has two cities: Darab and Jannat Shahr. The District has eight rural districts (dehestan): Bakhtajerd Rural District, Balesh Rural District, Fasarud Rural District, Hashivar Rural District, Nasrovan Rural District, Paskhan Rural District, Qaleh Biyaban Rural District, and Qaryah ol Kheyr Rural District.

References 

Darab County
Districts of Fars Province